Adrien Moreau (18 April 1843 – 22 February 1906) was a French genre and historical painter, sculptor and illustrator.

Moreau was born in Troyes in Aube départment. He began his artistic training as an apprentice glassmaker, but left for Paris to study at the École des Beaux-Arts under Léon Cogniet and Isidore Pils. He first exhibited at the Paris Salon in 1868, being described by fellow artist and critic, Joseph Uzanne, as "among the ranks of the greatest painters of contemporary genre". After a break occasioned by the Franco-Prussian war, it was his 1873 work, "Concert d’Amateurs dans un Atelier d’Artiste" which really established him in the public eye, and his art became in great demand, particularly in America.

He continued to exhibit at the salon until the end of his life, being awarded a silver medal in 1876 for "Repose at the farm". He also won silver medals at the 1889 and 1900 Exposition Universelle in Paris. Moreau became a Chevalier of the Légion d'honneur in 1892.

Moreau painted in oil (including Grisaille) and watercolour, and during his life became well known for his historical depictions of the French upper classes in past centuries, though he was equally at home in genre landscape paintings featuring peasants and their everyday life. He provided watercolor illustrations and drawings for books by authors such as Voltaire, Victor Hugo, Alphonse Daudet and Honoré de Balzac. He also wrote a book on the history of his family called "Les Moreaus" (1893).

He died in Paris in 1906. His work is represented in museums in Carcassonne, Nantes and Troyes. In 1996, his work "Gypsy dancer" sold for over 260,000 Euros at auction, while, in America, in April 2010, "Concert d'amateurs dans un atelier d'artiste" realised over $70,000.

Notes

External links and references
19th-Century French Oil Painting Emerges After 130 Years, Sells Immediately Amid Genre's Hot Demand
Moreau biography (Rehs Gallery inc.)
Moreau biography (FADA)
The Archer of Charles IX (Grisaille painting)

19th-century French painters
French male painters
20th-century French painters
20th-century French male artists
French genre painters
French watercolourists
People from Troyes
1843 births
1906 deaths
20th-century French sculptors
19th-century French sculptors
French male sculptors
19th-century French male artists